Boston Corner or Boston Corners may refer to some place in the United States:

 Boston Corner, Indiana, a neighborhood in Monroeville, Indiana
 Boston Corner, New York, a hamlet in the town of Ancram, New York